Lutheran Middle and High School North (LHSN)(All encompassing)is a parochial Christian high school in St. Louis County, Missouri in the United States.  It currently offers education in grades six through twelve, and is associated with the Lutheran Church–Missouri Synod. Lutheran North's mission states the following: "Lutheran High School North is a diverse educational community whose unity is in Jesus Christ. We exist to nurture young Christians for further education and Christian service."Lutheran North is accredited by AdvancED and National Lutheran Schools and is a charter member of the National Alliance of High Schools. Its governing body is a 15-member Board of Trustees, appointed by the 63 member congregations of the Lutheran High School Association of the Greater St. Louis Area. Lutheran North is currently administrated by Timothy Brackman as principal and Daniel Wenger as dean of students.

Overview 
Lutheran North operates on an alternating-day block schedule consisting of eight blocks. The first four blocks are held on Maroon (A) Days and the remaining four blocks are held on Gold (B) Days. Lutheran North was one of the first high schools in the St. Louis area to move from a traditional 7-period schedule to the block schedule. This took place in the 1994-1995 school year. In addition, the school has long been noted for its emphasis on the integration of technology in the classroom. Beginning in the 2012-2013 school year, Lutheran North, along with its sister school, Lutheran High School South, started a "One to one" technology initiative. This initiative was intended to help students integrate technology into all aspects of their education, most notably through the distribution of iPads to every student and faculty member. Starting in the 2019-2020 school year these iPads were replaced by chromebooks.

Over 85% of the teachers at Lutheran North hold a Master's degree. Over 96% of the students who graduate from LHSN attend a four-year university and about 95% of the student body participates in at least one co-curricular activity.

Worship Services 
Worship services at Lutheran North can be divided into the following two categories:

Chapel is held every day of the week except Wednesday in the school gymnasium. Administrated by the Dean of Chapel, Chapel services are typically traditional and usually follow the order of the historical Lutheran liturgy. Monday morning Chapel services consist of the reading of scripture passages appointed for the week and the singing of  hymns found in the Lutheran Worship hymnal. Services on Tuesday, Thursday, and Friday typically include a brief sermon or message, and the order of Confession and Absolution is typically administered at least once per week.

A small group of students is assigned the task of setting up the movable altar and pulpit, along with appropriate banners and paraments for the current season of the Church year every day before Chapel.

Small Group is held every Wednesday morning in place of Chapel. Students meet in groups of 15-20 students in their assigned classrooms for a time of prayer and devotion. Each Small Group is peer led by at least two "Peer Ministers", and is supervised by two faculty advisers. Each Small Group collects an offering and decides on a charitable organization for which they want to raise funds.

Peer Ministry 
Peer Ministers are exemplary students (10th-12th) who have been applied to serve as spiritual mentors, role models, and leaders at Lutheran High School North. Held to the highest of standards personally, behaviorally, and academically, Peer Ministers are not only responsible for setting good examples for other students, but are also in charge of leading Small Group devotions. Peer Ministers are required to attend a training session before each school year. The Peer Ministry Program is organized by Mrs. Cindy Burreson.

Athletics 
Lutheran North has an athletics program which includes 30 teams in 13 sports. They have won more than 120 individual and team MSHSAA District Championships and 14 Lutheran North teams have won State Championships. In 2004, their athletics department received a $1 million donation by alumni Jim Crane to improve the athletic facilities and to enlarge the campus size.

Notable alumni
Steve Atwater, class of 1984, former National Football League (NFL) player with the Denver Broncos
Jim Crane, class of 1972, Houston based logistics businessman, part-owner of the Houston Astros
Robert Douglas, class of 2000, former National Football League (NFL) player with the New York Giants
Bobby Joe Edmonds, class of 1982, former National Football League (NFL) player with the Seattle Seahawks, Los Angeles Raiders, and Tampa Bay Buccaneers
Kimora Lee Simmons, class of 1993, fashion model
Kurt Petersen , class of 1975, former National Football League (NFL) player with the Dallas Cowboys
Renell Wren, Class of 2014, 4th round draft pick of the Cincinnati Bengals (NFL) in 2019
John Hayden Jr. class of 1981 , Commissioner of Police, Metropolitan Police Department, City of St. Louis

References

External links
Lutheran High School North website

High schools in St. Louis County, Missouri
Private schools in St. Louis County, Missouri
Lutheran schools in Missouri
Private high schools in Missouri
Secondary schools affiliated with the Lutheran Church–Missouri Synod
1964 establishments in Missouri
Educational institutions established in 1964